Digha Bridge Halt is a small railway station in Patna district, Bihar, India. Its railway station code is DGBH. It saves time for rail passengers going to Gandhi Maidan at least 1 hour. The distance between the Digha–Sonpur Bridge and this halt is around 2 km. Due to this small but functional railway station many students, government employees and elderly people including patients, get easy access to basic transportation to Patna. AIIMS-Digha Elevated Corridor (Patli Path) is parallel to this halt.

Overview

Digha Bridge Halt was inaugurated on 25 November 2017. This 400-m halt was constructed at a cost of Rs 2.5 crore, and is equipped with basic facilities, including urinal and shades. On the first day, the Barauni–Patliputra Passenger (55230) was flagged off. Digha Bridge Halt is the only halt before the Digha–Sonpur rail-cum-road bridge.

Trains
Digha Bridge Halt falls under the jurisdiction of Danapur railway division. A total of six pairs of passenger trains stop at Digha Bridge Halt:

Nearest railway stations
The distance from nearby stations are:

References

External links 
 

Railway stations in Patna
Danapur railway division